Timothy James Clifford (born 31 March 1982) is an Australian politician. He is a member of Greens Western Australia, who represented the East Metropolitan Region in the Western Australian Legislative Council from 22 May 2017 to 21 May 2021.

Early life

Clifford was born in Albany, Western Australia. He grew up in a single-parent household with three sisters, and his mother worked while raising her four children.

During the 2000s, Clifford worked as a labourer completing FIFO work, but lost his job as the project was no longer profitable. Clifford attributed this to the "boom and bust cycle" of the mining industry. Clifford studied journalism and political studies at Edith Cowan University.

After university, Clifford worked as a public servant for a number of years before being elected to parliament. Clifford has lived in Perth for over 14 years.

Political career 

Clifford had previously stood for the Greens in the 2016 federal election in the Division of Perth. He was also the Greens candidate for Mount Lawley at the 2013 WA State Election and then later in the year at the Federal Election of 2013  he contested the federal seat of Stirling also as the Greens candidate.

He was elected to the Western Australian Legislative Council in the 2017 state election held on 11 March 2017. He is a member of the Greens Western Australia party, and represents the East Metropolitan Region. He was elected for four years, with Legislative Council terms beginning on 22 May 2017.

In Parliament, Clifford tabled a bill to push the McGowan Government to implement a net zero emissions target by 2040 and 100% renewable energy target by 2030. He also pushed for a motion that would declare a state of climate emergency in WA. Clifford believes in a "strong social safety net, good public education and an accessible health care system". Clifford believes the WA Parliament should suspend support for big oil and gas companies that have contributed to the exacerbation of climate change.

Clifford was defeated in his bid for re-election at the 2021 state election.

References

1982 births
Living people
Australian Greens members of the Parliament of Western Australia
Members of the Western Australian Legislative Council
21st-century Australian politicians